Pinkerton's Assorted Colours were an English pop band active during the 1960s. They are best known for their 1965 release, "Mirror, Mirror", which reached No. 9 in the UK Singles Chart in February 1966.

Career
Formed in Rugby, Warwickshire as 'The Liberators', they became Pinkerton's Assorted Colours in 1965, and scored a Top 10 hit with their first single release, "Mirror, Mirror" written and sung by bandmember Tony Newman. They were managed by Reginald Calvert, and supported by his then radio station, Radio City.  Lack of further chart success found them dubbed one-hit wonders.

Stuart Colman, Pinkerton’s one time bassist, went on to become a BBC Radio One DJ, and later a producer for Shakin' Stevens, Cliff Richard and Billy Fury.

After their second single they shortened their name to 'Pinkerton's Colours', then to 'Pinkertons'.  In 1969, following several lineup changes, they reformed as The Flying Machine, who also became one-hit wonders, albeit in the United States.

Band member Barrie Bernard later played in Jigsaw. Drummer David Holland left the band in 1968 to form Trapeze, and later became successful as the drummer for Judas Priest.

Members
 Tony Newman (born 1947, Rugby) - vocals, guitars
 Samuel "Pinkerton" Kempe (born 1946, Rugby) - vocals, autoharp
 David Holland (born 5 April 1948, Northampton - died 16 January 2018 in Spain) - drums
 Barrie Bernard (born 27 November 1944, Coventry) - bass guitar
 Tom Long (born 2 November 1945 Rugby) - lead guitar
 Stuart Colman (born Ian Stuart Colman, 19 December 1944, Harrogate, Yorkshire - died 19 April 2018) - bass, electric piano
 Steve Jones (born 1946, Coventry) - lead guitar, vocals (not to be confused with The Sex Pistols' guitarist)
 Paul Bridge-Wilkinson (known as Paul Wilkinson) (born 1948, Coventry) – drums, vocals
 Michael Summerson (born October 1950 - died February 2016) - bass guitar, vocals
 Philip Clough (born November 1947) - lead guitar, vocals
 Peter Robbins (born February 1959) - drums, vocals.
 Martyn "Stalky" Gleeson (born February 1955) - drums.

Discography

Singles
 "Mirror, Mirror" b/w "She Don't Care" 1965 – No. 9 UK
 "Don't Stop Loving Me Baby" / "Will Ya" 1966 – No. 50 UK
 "Magic Rockin' Horse" / "It Ain't Right" 1966 – No. 56 UK
 "Mum And Dad" / "On A Street Car" 1967
 "There's Nobody I'd Sooner Love" / "Duke's Jetty" 1968
 "Kentucky Woman" / "Behind The Mirror" 1968

See also
List of artists under the Decca Records label

References

External links
[ Pinkerton's Assorted Colours biography] at Allmusic website
BBC Radio based mini biography
Stuart Colman biography

Musical groups established in 1965
Musical groups disestablished in 1969
English pop music groups
Decca Records artists
Pye Records artists